Dutherson Clerveaux (born 20 January 1999) is a Haitian professional footballer who plays as a midfielder for the club Cavaly, and the Haiti national team.

International career
Clerveaux debuted with the Haiti national team in a 3–1 friendly win over Guyana on 11 June 2019. He was called up to represent Haiti at the 2021 CONCACAF Gold Cup.

References

External links
 
 

1999 births
Living people
People from Ouest (department)
Haitian footballers
Haiti international footballers
Haiti under-20 international footballers
Association football midfielders
Valencia FC (Haiti) players
Cavaly AS players
Ligue Haïtienne players
2021 CONCACAF Gold Cup players